State Route 276 (SR 276) is a  long state highway located entirely in Clermont County, Ohio. The route runs from an intersection with West Main Street (SR 133) and 5th Street in Williamsburg to US 50 and SR 132 in Owensville.

Route description
SR 276 begins at an intersection with West Main Street and 5th Street in downtown Williamsburg. In this area, SR 133 is routed along West Main Street; Fifth Street west of here and Main Street east of here formerly carried SR 32 before it was rerouted onto the Corridor D expressway in the 1970s. SR 133 and SR 276 travel concurrently heading northwest through Williamsburg. After , SR 133 turns north onto Tollgate Road leaving SR 276 to continue northwest into Williamsburg Township. After passing through the residential neighborhoods of Williamsburg, the road enters into a mixture of houses and farmland. SR 276 passes under the SR 32 expressway just outside the village but without a direct interchange. About  before its terminus, SR 132 joins SR 276 from the southwest at the Owensville village limits. In the center of Owensville, the two routes intersect US 50 (Main Street). At this intersection, SR 276 ends, but SR 132 continues by turning left onto US 50 west.

No part of SR 276 is a part of the National Highway System.

History
The highway connecting Williamsburg and Owensville has been a part of the state highway system since 1915. The former route numbers of this highway include SR 480 (c. 1915–1922), SR 132 (1923–1925), and SR 133 (1926–1929). By 1930, the route designation became SR 276. Within one year, the entire route became paved. Since then, no major changes have affected the route.

Major intersections

References

276
Transportation in Clermont County, Ohio